Marinella Mazzanti (born in Vinci, Tuscany, Italy) is an Italian inorganic chemist specialized in coordination chemistry. She is a professor at EPFL (École Polytechnique Fédérale de Lausanne) and the head of the group of Coordination Chemistry at EPFL's School of Basic Sciences.

Career 
After obtaining her "Diploma di Maturità Classica"(Bachelor) from the Liceo Virgilio in Empoli in 1978, Mazzanti studied inorganic chemistry at the University of Pisa and made her master's degree ("Laurea in Chimica") in 1985. She then joined Carlo Floriani at the University of Lausanne as a doctoral student to work low-valent vanadium chemistry. In 1990, she graduated with a PhD (with honors) for her thesis on "Coordination Chemistry of Vanadium (III) and Vanadium (II)." From 1989 to 1991, she was a lecturer in chemistry at the University of Lausanne. She spent one year as a postdoctoral fellow at the University of California, Berkeley working, before joining Alan L. Balch at University of California, Davis for one year to do research on transition metal chemistry. She received a Marie-Curie fellowship to work on metalloporphyrin chemistry at the French Alternative Energies and Atomic Energy Commission (CEA) in Grenoble with Jean-Claude Marchon. From 1996 to 2014, she held position first as research scientist and then as a research director at the same institution while working on f-block elements chemistry.

In 2014 she joined the EPFL faculty as senior scientist, before becoming Adjunct Professor at EPFL and head of the Group of Coordination Chemistry in 2016.

Research 
Mazzanti's research focuses on research in inorganic chemistry synthesis and the development of new molecules with novel properties and reactivities. Her research ranges from the development of lanthanide based luminescent and magnetic tags for bioanalytical and counterfeiting applications, to the design of actinide based molecular magnets and to small molecule activation by complexes of f-block and d-block metals.

Among her scientific achievements are the development of highly luminescent lanthanide complexes that provided insight into structure-properties relationships and enabled applications in bio-analysis and in material science, and the establishment of the first synthetic pathway to stable pentavalent uranyl complexes that led to the development of the first examples of uranium based exchange-coupled single molecules magnets.

She is also interested in the design of low-valent complexes of f-block elements, particularly of uranium based transformation processes of small molecules such as dinitrogen, carbon dioxide and carbon monoxide into compounds with higher value.

On example is her identification of polymetallic architectures that facilitate the cleavage of dinitrogen and its subsequent utilization in synthesis coupled with carbon dioxide, protons or carbon monoxide. Such polymetallic architectures based on f-block elements involve multimetallic and ligand-metal cooperativity, and allow for the extension of this concept to other transition metals.

Distinctions 
Mazzanti is the recipient of the 2021 ACS Albert Cotton award in synthetic inorganic chemistry. She was 2019 Randolph T. Major Lecturer at the University of Connecticut, 2016 Rubin Colloquium Technion Lecturer at the Israel Institute of Technology in Haifa, and 2009 Glenn T. Seaborg Memorial Lecturer at University of California, Berkeley. In 1994 she was awarded with the Marie Skłodowska-Curie Fellowship.

Mazzanti has been a member of editorial board of Helvetica Chimica Acta (since 2017), editorial board of Dalton Transaction (since 2017), and advisory board of Inorganic Chemistry (2011-2014).

She was a member of the management committee of the European Network COST D-38, of the international organizing committee of the Rare Earth Research Conference and of the Actinides international conference. She was a coordinator of Agence nationale de la recherche (ANR) and Swiss National Science Foundation (SNFS) funded projects.

Selected works

References

External links 
 
 Website of the Group of Coordination Chemistry

Living people
University of Lausanne alumni
1957 births
University of Pisa alumni
Academic staff of the École Polytechnique Fédérale de Lausanne
1959 births
Italian women scientists
Italian chemists